The European Journal of Cultural Studies is a peer-reviewed academic journal that covers the field of cultural studies in areas such as migration, post-colonial criticism and consumer cultures. The journal's editors-in-chief  are Joke Hermes (University of Amsterdam), Jo Littler (City, University London), Helen Wood (University of Lancaster), Anamik Saha (Goldsmiths University) and Chow Yui Fai. It was established in 1998 and is currently published by SAGE Publications.

Abstracting and indexing 
The European Journal of Cultural Studies is abstracted and indexed in Scopus and the Social Sciences Citation Index. According to the Journal Citation Reports, its 2016 impact factor is 1.244, ranking it 5th out of 39 journals in the category "Cultural Studies".

References

External links 
 

SAGE Publishing academic journals
English-language journals
Publications established in 1998
Quarterly journals
Cultural journals